Thomas Lindsay may refer to:
Thomas Lindsay (academic), American educator and academic
Thomas Lindsay (bishop) (1656–1724), Anglican clergyman, Archbishop of Armagh
Thomas Martin Lindsay (1843–1914), Scottish historian
Thomas Lindsay (priest) (died 1947), Archdeacon of Cleveland
Tom Lindsay (rugby union) (born 1987), English rugby union player
Tom Lindsay (footballer) (1903–1979), Scottish footballer

See also